Five Songs may refer to:

Music

Classical compositions
Five Songs (1956–57) by Witold Lutosławski
Cinq mélodies, Op. 2 (1869) by Henri Duparc

Albums and EPs
Five Songs and a Cover, a 2005 EP by Foo Fighters
 5 Songs (Seether EP), 2002
 5 Songs (The Decemberists EP), 2001
 5 Songs (Iced Earth EP), 2011
 5 Songs, a 2007 EP by The Story So Far

See also
Music to Five Poems by J. P. Jacobsen, Op. 4 (1891), songs composed by Carl Nielsen
Five Songs from the Norwegian (1888), a compositions by Frederick Delius
Five Mystical Songs (1906–1911), by Ralph Vaughan Williams
Five Flower Songs (1950), by Benjamin Britten
5 Songs Dedicated to Louis Hornbeck, compositions by Edvard Grieg
Cinco canciones populares argentinas (1943), by Alberto Ginastera 
Cinco canciones negras (1945), by Xavier Montsalvatge
Cinco canciones para niños y dos canciones profanas (1938–1939), by Silvestre Revueltas
Cinco canciones a una paloma que es el alma (1955), by Ricardo Molinari
Cinco Canciones Vascas for Soprano and Orchestra, by Tomás Garbizu
5 Little Songs (5 Petites chansons) (1915), a composition by Reynaldo Hahn
Cinq Chansons à Hurle-Vent (2014), by Ben Foskett
Cinq chansons folkloriques et deux rigaudons à une voix (c. 1931), compositions by Vincent d'Indy
A number of compositions by Eugène Bozza beginning Cinq chansons ..." Cinq chansons pour les enfants (1932, a composition by Jean FrançaixCinq Chansons de femme (1952), by Philip CannonCinq chansons de Paul Fort, Op. 18 (1935), by Jean AbsilFive Spanish Songs'', a 2013 EP by Destroyer